Hard is a French television series created and produced by Cathy Verney, airing since 9 May 2008 on Canal+ in France, and later internationally. The series focuses on the pornographic movie industry. It is part of the "New Trilogy" collection on Canal+.

Synopsis
After the sudden death of her husband, Sophie discovers through her mother-in-law, that her late husband did not run a successful software company, but instead produced pornographic films, with Soph'X being the legacy.

Bewildered and dismayed, at discovering a world she couldn't conceive of in a thousand years, she hesitates between taking over the company or selling everything to resume her job as a lawyer. To pay the mortgage held by her husband before his death, she has to decide to modernize Soph'X, until a meeting with porn star and pillar of the company, Roy Lapoutre, forces her hand.

Cast

Recurring Role
Natacha Lindinger – Sophie
François Vincentelli – Jean-Marc Danel / Roy Lapoutre
Stéphan Wojtowicz – Pierre
Charlie Dupont – Corrado
Anne Caillon – Mathilde
Claire Dumas & Alice Dufour – Joujou
Cedric Chevalme – Rudy
Jean-Noël Cnokaert – Philippe Boule
Axel Wursten – Jules
Jonathan Cohen – Vikash
Corinne Masiero - Sonia
Fanny Sidney – Violette
Mehdi Nebbou – Rémi Capelle
Michèle Moretti – Louise
Claire Nadeau – Anne-Marie Teissere 
Valérie Kéruzoré – Armelle
Michèle Laroque - Madeleine Fournier

Guest
Anne Benoît - Madame Martel
Cécile de France – Herself 
Denis Podalydès – Himself 
Élisabeth Margoni – Nadine
Elli Medeiros – Eve
François Civil – Tony 
Françoise Lépine - Françoise
Guillaume Gallienne – Himself 
Lyes Salem – Henri Sainte-Rose
Philippe Nahon – Daniel
Philippe Rebbot – Nathaniel Micheletty
Thomas Coumans

Episodes
Season 1 originally aired from 9 to 23 May 2008, over 6 episodes of 26 minutes.
Season 2 originally aired from 30 May to 20 June 2011, over 12 episodes of 26 minutes.
Season 3 originally aired from 1 June to 6 July 2015, over 12 episodes of 26 minutes.

International distribution
The first season of the series was also broadcast in Hungary late 2010 under the title Derült égből porn, on the channel HBO Magyarország. It was proposed as a TV movie in two parts, the first lasting 74 minutes and the second lasting 78 minutes. Sky Arts started airing the first series in July 2013.

In 2016, SBS2 began airing the show weekly in Australia (with subtitles), starting with Season 3 and beginning with an introductory airing of three episodes consecutively on one night. SBS also offered the whole season available to stream on their website for Australian audiences. So far there are no announcements made as to whether or not they will air the first two seasons.

Brazilian remake and HBO Max
In 2020, HBO Latin America produced a Brazilian remake of the original French series. The remake is available for streaming in the United States on HBO Max.

References

External links
 – official site

Hard on Sky Arts
Hard on AlloCiné 

2008 French television series debuts
French television sitcoms
Television series set in the 2000s
Works about pornography
Canal+ original programming
French comedy-drama television series
2015 French television series endings
2000s French comedy television series
2000s French drama television series
2010s French comedy television series
2010s French drama television series